The 2019 Northern European Gymnastics Championships was an artistic gymnastics competition held in Kópavogur, Iceland. The event was held between 21 and 22 September.

Medalists

References

2019 in gymnastics
Northern European Gymnastics Championships